Aceh Tamiang Regency is a regency  in the east of Aceh province of Indonesia, bordering on North Sumatra Province to the east. It is located on the island of Sumatra. The regency covers an area of 1,957.02 square kilometres and had a population of 251,914 people at the 2010 census and 294,356 at the 2020 Census; the official estimate as at mid 2021 was 297,522. The seat of the regency government is at the town of Karang Baru.

Administrative districts 

The regency is divided administratively into twelve districts (kecamatan), listed below with their areas and their populations at the 2010 Census and the 2020 Census, together with the official estimates as at mid 2021. The table also includes the location of the district administrative centres, the number of villages (rural desa and urban kelurahan) in each district, and its postal code.

See also 

 List of regencies and cities of Indonesia

References 

Regencies of Aceh